Claes Göran Reimerthi (12 January 1955 – 23 July 2021) was a Swedish comic book author. He was most well-known for his Swedish language version of The Phantom, known as Fantomen.

Awards
Adamson Award for Best Swedish Comic-Strip Cartoonist (2001; co-won with Hans Lindahl)
Urhunden Prize (2015)

References

1955 births
2021 deaths
Swedish male writers
Swedish comics writers
People from Ystad